Dig? is the second album by Bill Bruford's Earthworks, featuring Django Bates, Iain Ballamy and fretless bass guitarist Tim Harries (replacing the acoustic bass guitarist Mick Hutton). It was released on EG Records in 1989.

Reception

AllMusic awarded the album 3 stars, and reviewer Robert Taylor called it "a solid effort," stating, "Never one to rest on his laurels, Bruford continued to search for different contexts in which to express his musical and percussive ideas."

The authors of The Penguin Guide to Jazz Recordings wrote: "On Dig? the highlight... isn't the fine original opener... but the arrangement of Tony Hatch's 'Downtown'.

Writing for All About Jazz, John Kelman commented: "Dig?... finds the group moving... into exploratory territory... Likely a result of the growing confidence that comes from having some history together, the group's interplay is even more vivid."

Jazz Journal's Mark Gilbert remarked: "Earthworks are going in the right direction, but next time I would suggest an embargo on anything over 35 key and tempo changes per minute."

Track listing
 "Stromboli Kicks" (Iain Ballamy, Django Bates, Bill Bruford) – 5:34 
 "Gentle Persuasion" (Ballamy, Bates) – 4:22
 "Downtown" (Tony Hatch) – 5:50
 "Pilgrim's Way" (Ballamy, Bruford) – 6:23
 "Dancing on Frith Street" (Bates) – 4:19
 "A Stone's Throw" (Ballamy, Bates, Bruford) – 6:06
 "Libreville" (Ballamy, Bates, Bruford) – 6:10
 "Coroboree" (Ballamy, Bruford) – 4:47

Personnel
Bill Bruford – acoustic and electronic drums, percussion 
Django Bates – keyboards, tenor horn, trumpet
Iain Ballamy – soprano, alto and tenor and baritone saxophones
Tim Harries – acoustic and fretless bass guitar

References

Bill Bruford albums
Earthworks (band) albums
1989 albums
E.G. Records albums
Albums produced by Adam Moseley